Vadhir Derbez Alejandro González Torres Prince (born 18 February 1991), better known as Vadhir Derbez, is a Mexican actor and singer who has worked for Televisa, Univision, Warner Brothers, Netflix, TV Azteca and Telemundo.

Personal life 
Derbez was born in Mexico City. His father is comic actor Eugenio Derbez.

He studied at military school Culver Academies for four years, where he practiced equestrianism. He rode in Barack Obama's Inaugural parade in Washington D.C. in 2009.

Career

Television 

Vadhir began his acting career in 1997 at age six on the program "Derbez en Cuando", where he participated in the sketches "Tatiana y En Familia con Chabelo" (2000), and "Diseñador do ambos sexos" (2001). He earned his first featured part in the novela (soap opera) "Cómplices Al Rescate" (2002). "La familia P. Luche" (2002) was his next involved work, followed by "De pocas, pocas pulgas" (2003), "Par de ases" (2004), "Mujer, Casos de la Vida Real" (2004).

In 2016, Vadhir played the role of "César Suárez", the psychopathic son of a drug lord in the soap opera "La querida del Centauro", a production of Sony Pictures, Teleset, and in collaboration with Telemundo, the show was aired in the United States, Mexico, and South America. In the same year the actor played a lead role in the first series shared amongst TV Azteca and Televisa Blim, "Entre correr y vivir", based on the lives of Ricardo and Pedro Rodríguez. This show was filmed in the race course of Mexico City and in it Vadhir played the role of the race pilot Rodrigo Hernández. In 2019, he won the first season of ¿Quién es la máscara? as Camaleon.

Entering the international market, the actor obtained a role on the Netflix series, Sense8 (2016) alongside Miguel Ángel Silvestre and Alfonso Herrera.

Theatre 

The actor made his theater debut playing Tom Sawyer, the lead role in "Las aventuras de Tom Sawyer"(2004), an adaption of the story by Mark Twain. In 2013 he took part in the musical "Grease", playing 3 different roles (Tacho, Kiko, and Danny Sucko) during this time. Afterwards he earned a lead part in the Broadway musical "Rock of Ages" (2014), playing the role of Jerry, along with the actress and singer Dulce Maria. He then played a lead role in Grease (2017) once more on "Musical USA" making rounds in a few cities in the United States.

Film 
Vadhir earned his first part on the big screen giving voice to the character "Chuletas" in the 2005 animated film Imaginum, but it wasn not until 2015 that he had a role in a live-action film, appearing in the action film Ladrones, alongside Fernando Colunga, Eduardo Yáñez, Jessica Lindsay, and Miguel Varoni. In 2016, he obtained his first lead role in film El tamaño si Importa, directed by Rafa Lara. The next year he was in the film 3 Idiotas, an adaptation of the popular Bollywood film 3 Idiots. After his success in Mexico, he made his Hollywood debut in the film How to Be a Latin Lover (2017), playing a younger version of the character played by his father Eugenio. In May 2019, Vadhir co-starred as Beto in the comedy film Dulce familia.

Music 

Derbez made his music debut with his first EP, "Vadhir Derbez" released 2 September 2016. It featured two singles: "Te Olvidé" and "Me Haces Sentir". "Me Haces Sentir" was later re-released on 14 February 2017 with the live version included.

His musical and cinematic career briefly overlapped his song "Al Final" was released under the soundtrack of "3 Idiotas" on 7 March 2017, a movie which he was also featured on April 27, 2017, Derbez released his fourth single, "Latin Lover".

After a period of almost two years, Vadhir released his next single "Mala" on 5 April 2019, and has announced that his last song "Toda La Banda" was released in June 2019.

Filmography

Film

Television roles

Discography

Albums 
EP

 Vadhir Derbez (2016)

Singles  
Me Haces Sentir (2016)
Te Olvide (2016)
 Al Final (2016)
Latin Lover (2017)
Mala (2019)
Toda La Banda (2019)
Buena Suerte| VD ft. Mario Bautista & Yera (18/11/2020)
Luna| VD & Ir Sais (28/04/2021)
Te Confieso| VD ft. Ximena Sariñana (16/07/2021)
Te Confieso Acoustic Session| VD Ft. Jass Reyes (15/12/2021)

Soundtracks 

 Cómplices al Rescate (2001)
 De Pocas Pocas Pulgas (2003)

Accolades 
On November 21, 2010, he won first place in Mira Quien Baila: First Season.

References

Further reading

External links
 

Living people
Mexican male telenovela actors
1991 births
Mexican male film actors
Male actors from Mexico City
Mexican people of French descent